Allan Gunthard Franck (September 17, 1888 – May 28, 1963) was a Finnish sailor who competed in the 1912 Summer Olympics. He was a crew member of the Finnish boat Nina, which won the silver medal in the 10 metre class.

References

External links
profile

1888 births
1963 deaths
Finnish male sailors (sport)
Sailors at the 1912 Summer Olympics – 10 Metre
Olympic sailors of Finland
Olympic silver medalists for Finland
Olympic medalists in sailing
Medalists at the 1912 Summer Olympics
20th-century Finnish people